Elliott is an unincorporated community in Lawrence County, in the U.S. state of Missouri.

The community was named after the original owner (George Calvin Elliott) of the town site.

References

Unincorporated communities in Lawrence County, Missouri
Unincorporated communities in Missouri